Praseodymium(III) perchlorate is the perchlorate salt of praseodymium, with the chemical formula  of Pr(ClO4)3.

Preparation 
Praseodymium(III) perchlorate can be prepared from praseodymium(III,IV) oxide. Dissolving praseodymium(III,IV) oxide in a slight excess  of hydrochloric acid and adding a small amount of hydrogen peroxide can prepare praseodymium perchlorate.

Chemical properties 
Praseodymium perchlorate can form two complexes with crown ether 18-crown-6 in stoichiometric ratios of 1:1 and 1:2., and can form complexes with L-proline, glutamic acid, mandelic acid, penicillamine. It can also form complexes with imidazole and alanine.

References 

Praseodymium compounds
Perchlorates